Welcome.US
is a nonprofit organization that coordinates the support of Afghan refugees in US.

The organization was formed in 2021 as the US evacuated 100,000 refugees from Afghanistan following the transfer of power to the Taliban.

The organization coordinates government, private sector and non-government organizations providing financial, material and advisory support to Afghan refugees.

The organization is led by Nazanin Ash supervised by a board of directors that is supported by three former US presidents and three former US first ladies.

Formation and leadership 
Welcome.US launched in September 2021 led by CEO Nazanin Ash.

The board of directors is co-chaired by John Bridgeland and Cecilia Muñoz with support from Laura Bush, George W. Bush, Hillary Clinton, Bill Clinton, Michelle Obama, Barack Obama, Khaled Hosseini, and Stanley McCrystal.

Background 
By 22 December 2021, over 70,000 of the 100,000 Afghans that US had evacuated from Afghanistan had arrived in US. They originally were all temporarily housed at eight US military bases and as of 22 December 2021, just over 40,000 had left the military bases and moved into housing in various communities.

Activities 
Welcome.US coordinates refugee support efforts between all levels of US government, not for profit organizations, and private sector organizations. The government financial support includes $2,275 per person for rent, food, and clothing, plus food stamps and rent relief. Non-financial support includes help with finding housing, learning how to navigate transit systems, enrolling children in school, completing immigration paperwork, legal support, and access to mental health services.

Government support is supplemented by companies including Starbucks, CVS Pharmacy, Microsoft, AirBnB, and Serta Simmons Bedding who have donated tea, diapers, and mattresses as well as financial support, temporary housing and job opportunities. Welcome.US uses Needslist software to connect the refugees to these services provided by resettlement support groups and corporations.

Welcome.US also provides emergency funding to not-for-profits organizations and runs media campaigns to encourage US citizens to support refugees.

In October 2021, Welcome.US collaborated with Miles4Migrants to fund 40,000 flights for Afghan refugees. 3,200 of the flights have been used so far.

See also 

 War in Afghanistan (2001–2021)
 2021 Kabul airlift
Convention Relating to the Status of Refugees

References

External links 

 Welcome.US official website

Refugee aid organizations in the United States
Organizations established in 2021
Humanitarian aid organizations
Organizations based in the Americas